Hilal al-Hilal (born 1966) is a Syrian politician who is the current Assistant Secretary-General of the Syrian Regional Branch of the Ba'ath Party, and was the Party Secretary of the Branch Command of Aleppo in 2011. He served two terms as a member of the Aleppo party Branch Command.

References

1966 births
Living people
Members of the Regional Command of the Arab Socialist Ba'ath Party – Syria Region
People of the Syrian civil war
Syrian Muslims